Irakli Maisuradze (born 22 August 1988) is a Georgian professional footballer who plays as a midfielder for Greek Super League 2 club Asteras Vlachioti.

Career
On 22 July 2017, the Georgian central midfielder is expected to be released from Panionios, only a few weeks after the announcement of deal with the club. The 29-year-old international is not in the season plans of Panionios manager Michalis Grigoriou and its seems that he will have to leave his current team and continue his career elsewhere.

References

External links
 
 
 Profile at uefa.com

1988 births
Living people
Footballers from Georgia (country)
Association football midfielders
Georgia (country) international footballers
Expatriate footballers from Georgia (country)
Expatriate footballers in Belarus
Expatriate footballers in Malta
Expatriate footballers in Cyprus
Expatriate footballers in Hungary
Expatriate footballers in Greece
Expatriate sportspeople from Georgia (country) in Belarus
Expatriate sportspeople from Georgia (country) in Malta
Expatriate sportspeople from Georgia (country) in Cyprus
Expatriate sportspeople from Georgia (country) in Hungary
Cypriot First Division players
FC Zestafoni players
FC Partizan Minsk players
FC Vitebsk players
FC Metalurgi Rustavi players
FC Dila Gori players
Valletta F.C. players
Anorthosis Famagusta F.C. players
Ermis Aradippou FC players
Balmazújvárosi FC players
Nemzeti Bajnokság I players
Asteras Vlachioti F.C. players